Fabiola María Sánchez Jiménez (born 9 April 1993) is a Costa Rican footballer who plays as a midfielder for Israeli Ligat Nashim club F.C. Ramat HaSharon and the Costa Rica women's national team.

Honours 
Costa Rica
Winner
 Central American Games: 2013

References

External links
 
 Profile  at Fedefutbol
 

1993 births
Living people
People from Alajuela
Costa Rican women's footballers
Women's association football midfielders
UT Southern FireHawks women's soccer players
Speranza Osaka-Takatsuki players
F.C. Ramat HaSharon players
Ligat Nashim players
College women's soccer players in the United States
Costa Rica women's international footballers
2015 FIFA Women's World Cup players
Pan American Games bronze medalists for Costa Rica
Pan American Games medalists in football
Footballers at the 2019 Pan American Games
Footballers at the 2015 Pan American Games
Costa Rican expatriate footballers
Costa Rican expatriate sportspeople in the United States
Expatriate women's soccer players in the United States
Costa Rican expatriate sportspeople in Japan
Expatriate women's footballers in Japan
Costa Rican expatriate sportspeople in the United Kingdom

Expatriate women's footballers in Scotland
Costa Rican expatriates in Israel
Expatriate women's footballers in Israel
Medalists at the 2019 Pan American Games